XHSNP-FM is a radio station on 97.7 FM in San Luis Potosí, San Luis Potosí. It is owned by Multimedios Radio and carries its La Caliente grupera format.

History
XHSNP received its concession on November 1, 1992. It was owned by Multimedios subsidiary Enlaces Audiovisuales, S.A. de C.V. and broadcast with 3 kW on 93.7 MHz, carrying a romantic format known as Estéreo Recuerdo. During this time, Multimedios operated XEWA 540 as "Súper Estelar"; when 540 AM lost the format, Multimedios brought it to XHSNP.

In June 1997, XHSNP moved to 97.7, which allowed it a power increase to 50 kW. Since then, the station has increased to an effective radiated power of 80 kW.

References

Radio stations in San Luis Potosí
Multimedios Radio